In nine-dimensional geometry, a rectified 9-simplex is a convex uniform 9-polytope, being a rectification of the regular 9-simplex.

These polytopes are part of a family of 271 uniform 9-polytopes with A9 symmetry.

There are unique 4 degrees of rectifications. Vertices of the rectified 9-simplex are located at the edge-centers of the 9-simplex. Vertices of the birectified 9-simplex are located in the triangular face centers of the 9-simplex. Vertices of the trirectified 9-simplex are located in the tetrahedral cell centers of the 9-simplex. Vertices of the quadrirectified 9-simplex are located in the 5-cell centers of the 9-simplex.

Rectified 9-simplex 

The rectified 9-simplex is the vertex figure of the 10-demicube.

Alternate names
 Rectified decayotton (reday) (Jonathan Bowers)

Coordinates 

The Cartesian coordinates of the vertices of the rectified 9-simplex can be most simply positioned in 10-space as permutations of (0,0,0,0,0,0,0,0,1,1). This construction is based on facets of the rectified 10-orthoplex.

Images

Birectified 9-simplex 

This polytope is the vertex figure for the 162 honeycomb. Its 120 vertices represent the kissing number of the related hyperbolic 9-dimensional sphere packing.

Alternate names
 Birectified decayotton (breday) (Jonathan Bowers)

Coordinates 
The Cartesian coordinates of the vertices of the birectified 9-simplex can be most simply positioned in 10-space as permutations of (0,0,0,0,0,0,0,1,1,1). This construction is based on facets of the birectified 10-orthoplex.

Images

Trirectified 9-simplex

Alternate names
 Trirectified decayotton (treday) (Jonathan Bowers)

Coordinates 
The Cartesian coordinates of the vertices of the trirectified 9-simplex can be most simply positioned in 10-space as permutations of (0,0,0,0,0,0,1,1,1,1). This construction is based on facets of the trirectified 10-orthoplex.

Images

Quadrirectified 9-simplex

Alternate names
 Quadrirectified decayotton 
 Icosayotton (icoy) (Jonathan Bowers)

Coordinates 
The Cartesian coordinates of the vertices of the quadrirectified 9-simplex can be most simply positioned in 10-space as permutations of (0,0,0,0,0,1,1,1,1,1). This construction is based on facets of the quadrirectified 10-orthoplex.

Images

Notes

References 
 H.S.M. Coxeter: 
 H.S.M. Coxeter, Regular Polytopes, 3rd Edition, Dover New York, 1973 
 Kaleidoscopes: Selected Writings of H.S.M. Coxeter, edited by F. Arthur Sherk, Peter McMullen, Anthony C. Thompson, Asia Ivic Weiss, Wiley-Interscience Publication, 1995,  
 (Paper 22) H.S.M. Coxeter, Regular and Semi Regular Polytopes I, [Math. Zeit. 46 (1940) 380-407, MR 2,10]
 (Paper 23) H.S.M. Coxeter, Regular and Semi-Regular Polytopes II, [Math. Zeit. 188 (1985) 559-591]
 (Paper 24) H.S.M. Coxeter, Regular and Semi-Regular Polytopes III, [Math. Zeit. 200 (1988) 3-45]
 Norman Johnson Uniform Polytopes, Manuscript (1991)
 N.W. Johnson: The Theory of Uniform Polytopes and Honeycombs, Ph.D. (1966)
  o3x3o3o3o3o3o3o3o - reday, o3o3x3o3o3o3o3o3o - breday, o3o3o3x3o3o3o3o3o - treday, o3o3o3o3x3o3o3o3o - icoy

External links 
 Polytopes of Various Dimensions
 Multi-dimensional Glossary

9-polytopes